Sofiane Djebarat (born 7 May 1983 in Toudja, Béjaïa Province) is an Algerian professional football player who currently plays as a defender for Algerian Ligue 2 club Olympique de Médéa.

Statistics

References

External links

1983 births
Living people
People from Toudja
Algerian footballers
Olympique de Médéa players
Algerian Ligue 2 players
AS Khroub players
MC Oran players
JSM Béjaïa players
MO Béjaïa players
Association football defenders
21st-century Algerian people